USS H-1 (SS-28), the lead ship of her class of submarine of the United States Navy, was originally named Seawolf, making her the first ship of the U.S. Navy to be named for the seawolf.

Seawolf was laid down by the Union Iron Works of San Francisco, California. She was renamed on 17 November 1911, launched on 6 May 1913 sponsored by Miss Lesley Jean Makins, and commissioned at Mare Island Navy Yard on 1 December 1913.

Service history
The new submarine was attached to Torpedo Flotilla 2, Pacific Fleet, and operated along the West Coast out of San Pedro, California. During various exercises and patrols, she traveled the coast from Los Angeles, California to lower British Columbia, often in company with her sister ships  and sometimes .

Sailing from San Pedro, California on 17 October 1917, she reached New London, Connecticut on 8 November. For the remainder of World War I, she was based there and patrolled Long Island Sound, frequently with officer students from the submarine school on board.

H-1 and H-2 sailed for San Pedro, California on 6 January 1920, transiting the Panama Canal on 20 February. On 12 March, as H-1 made her way up the coast of Mexico's Baja California Peninsula, she ran aground on a shoal off Magdalena Bay.

Further salvage effort was abandoned. Her name was stricken from the Naval Vessel Register on 12 April, and she was sold for scrap in June 1920, but never recovered.

In 2019, her wreck was identified south of Baja California.

References

External links
 
 On Eternal Patrol: USS H-1

United States H-class submarines
World War I submarines of the United States
Lost submarines of the United States
Maritime incidents in 1920
United States submarine accidents
Shipwrecks of Mexico
Ships built in San Francisco
1913 ships
Ships built by Union Iron Works